Cornerhouse was a centre for cinema and the contemporary visual arts, located next to Oxford Road Station on Oxford Street, Manchester, England, which was active from 1985–2015. It had three floors of art galleries, three cinemas, a bookshop, a bar and a café bar. Cornerhouse was operated by Greater Manchester Arts Centre Ltd, a registered charity.

The buildings
Cornerhouse occupied two buildings. The main building, 70 Oxford Street, was built for John Shaw in the early 1900s and was a furniture store run by the family until it closed in 1985. The building on the other side of the approach to Oxford Road station was designed by Peter Cummings, completed in 1934 and opened as a cinema, Tatler News Theatre, in May 1935. The cinema had numerous name changes (Essoldo, Tatler Classic, Tatler Cinema Club) before closing in 1981.

History

Cornerhouse was conceived by the Greater Manchester Visual Arts Trust, chaired by Sir Bob Scott. It opened with the support of the then Greater Manchester County Council and Manchester City Council, North West Arts Association (now part of Arts Council England) and the British Film Institute.

Cornerhouse's first Director was Dewi Lewis, who had previously been Director of Bury Metro Arts. The building opened on 3 October 1985. The first film screened (on 18 October) was Nic Roeg's Insignificance. Dave Moutrey has been Director and CEO since 1998.

Since its inception, Cornerhouse has hosted the UK premiere of Quentin Tarantino’s Reservoir Dogs and was the first UK public gallery to commission work from Damien Hirst.

In 2012, it was announced that Cornerhouse would merge with the Library Theatre Company to form HOME. In 2015, both organisations moved to new premises at the HOME centre.

From March 2017 to August 2017 the Conerhouse Cinema was squatted by the Loose Space Collective before being evicted.

Programme

The Cornerhouse offered independent cinema, and contemporary art in the galleries. Cornerhouse's contemporary visual art programme was dedicated to launching artists who had not received major institutional recognition in Britain. It also let mid-career artists realise new projects in commissions and exhibitions on and off-site. The visual arts programme presented works in all media, with an emphasis on film and video that has a strong link with the film programme.

Cornerhouse produced or co-produced all of its exhibitions as well as a programme for each show. A regular feature of its visual arts programme was international group exhibitions which explored socio-political concerns. In 2011, Cornerhouse launched Artist Film, a project for the production and distribution longer films, starting with Gillian Wearing’s Self Made. Cornerhouse was a partner in the plus Tate programme.

On average, 30 titles were screened across the three screens every month. The cinemas were open seven days a week, with daily matinée and evening performances (no matinées on Monday), making a total of almost 3,500 screenings annually.

Cornerhouse's film programme was international in scope and offered new and innovative film and video alongside more familiar work. This resulted in the screening of new films and re-releases; second runs of overlooked or underrated titles; classic and archive material; shorts, animation and documentary; avant garde film and television; and foreign language films. Alongside a variety of touring film programmes, Cornerhouse also ran two festivals every year ¡Viva! Spanish and Latin American Film Festival and exposures.

Books

In 1987, Dewi Lewis launched the Cornerhouse Publications imprint with A Green and Pleasant Land by John Davies. Cornerhouse Publications was joint winner of The Sunday Times Small Publisher of The Year Award in 1990. The imprint continued to be active until 1994 and over the period published books by many major international photographers.

Notes

References

External links

Culture in Manchester
Tourist attractions in Manchester
Art museums and galleries in Manchester
Former cinemas in Manchester
Buildings and structures in Manchester
Book publishing companies of the United Kingdom
Visual arts publishing companies
Distribution companies of the United Kingdom
Former squats
Squats in the United Kingdom